Gottlieb Madl was a film editor who worked in the German film industry for many years. He edited the 1933 Nazi propaganda film S.A.-Mann Brand.

Selected filmography
 The Tunnel (1933)
 The Master Detective (1933)
 S.A.-Mann Brand (1933)
 Inheritance in Pretoria (1934)
 The Fugitive from Chicago (1934)
 The King's Prisoner (1935)
 The Three Around Christine (1936)
 Street Music (1936)
 The Glass Ball (1937)
 Five Million Look for an Heir (1938)
 All Lies (1938)
 Gold in New Frisco (1939)
 The Leghorn Hat (1939)
 The Girl from Barnhelm (1940)
 The Eternal Spring (1940)
 The Fire Devil (1940)
 Venus on Trial (1941)
 What Does Brigitte Want? (1941)
 A Heart Beats for You (1949)

References

Bibliography 
 Giesen, Rolf. Nazi Propaganda Films: A History and Filmography. McFarland & Company, 2003.

External links 
 

Year of birth unknown
Year of death unknown
German film editors